Mork & Mindy is an American television sitcom that aired on ABC from September 14, 1978, to May 27, 1982. A spin-off after a highly successful episode of Happy Days, "My Favorite Orkan", it starred Robin Williams as Mork, an extraterrestrial who comes to Earth from the planet Ork, and Pam Dawber as Mindy McConnell, his human friend, roommate, and eventual love interest.

History

Premise and initial success
Mork first appears in the Happy Days season five episode "My Favorite Orkan", which aired in February 1978 and is a take on the 1960s sitcom My Favorite Martian. The show wanted to feature a spaceman in order to capitalize on the popularity of the recently released Star Wars film. Williams' character, Mork, attempts to take Richie Cunningham back to his planet of Ork as a specimen but is foiled by Fonzie. In the initial broadcast, it turned out to be a dream of Richie's. But when Mork proved popular, the syndicated version was re-edited to show Mork erasing the experience from everyone's minds.

The character of Mork was played by the then-unknown Robin Williams, who impressed producer Garry Marshall with his quirky comedic ability as soon as they met. Dom DeLuise and Roger Rees were offered the role but both passed. Richard Lewis and Jeff Altman were considered. When Williams was asked to take a seat at the audition, he sat on his head and Marshall cast him on the spot, later wryly commenting that Williams was the only alien who auditioned.

Mork & Mindy is set in Boulder, Colorado, in the then present-day late 1970s and early 1980s  (as opposed to the Happy Days setting of Milwaukee in the late 1950s). Mork explains to Richie that he is from the "future": the 1970s.

Mork arrives on Earth in an egg-shaped spacecraft. He has been assigned to observe human behavior by Orson, his mostly unseen and long-suffering superior (voiced by Ralph James). Orson has sent Mork to get him off Ork, where humor is not permitted. Attempting to fit in, Mork dresses in an Earth suit, but wears it backwards. Landing in Boulder, Colorado, he encounters 21-year-old Mindy (Pam Dawber), who is upset after an argument with her boyfriend, and offers assistance. Because of his odd garb, she mistakes him for a priest and is taken in by his willingness to listen (in fact, simply observing her behavior). When Mindy notices his backward suit and unconventional behavior, she asks who he really is, and he innocently tells her the truth. She promises to keep his identity a secret and allows him to move into her attic. Mindy's father Fred (Conrad Janis) objects to his daughter living with a man (particularly one as bizarre as Mork), but Fred's mother-in-law Cora (Elizabeth Kerr) approves of Mork and the living arrangement. Mindy and Cora work at Fred's music store, where Cora gives violin lessons to Eugene (Jeffrey Jacquet), a 10-year-old boy who becomes Mork's friend. Also seen occasionally are Mindy's snooty old high school friend Susan (Morgan Fairchild) and the possibly insane Exidor (Robert Donner).

Storylines usually center on Mork's attempts to understand human behavior and American culture as Mindy helps him to adjust to life on Earth. It usually ends up frustrating Mindy, as Mork can only do things according to Orkan customs. For example, lying to someone or not informing them it will rain is considered a practical joke (called "splinking") on Ork. At the end of each episode, Mork reports back to Orson on what he has learned about Earth. These end-of-show summaries allow Mork to humorously comment on social norms.

Mork's greeting is "Na-Nu Na-Nu" (pronounced ) along with a hand gesture similar to Mr. Spock's Vulcan salute from Star Trek combined with a handshake. It became a popular catchphrase at the time, as did "Shazbot", an Orkan interjection that Mork uses. Mork says "KO" in place of "OK".

This series was Robin Williams' first major acting role.  Scripts were shorter than on Happy Days, with notes specifying "Robin will do something here" to let Williams improvise. However, often his improvisations, due to unsuitability for a general television audience, had to be replaced with seeming ad libs that were actually scripted by a large team.

The series was extremely popular in its first season. The Nielsen ratings were very high, ranking at 3, behind Laverne & Shirley (at 1) and Three's Company (at 2), both on ABC, which was the highest-rated network in the U.S. in 1978. The show gained higher ratings than the Happy Days series that had spawned it, at 4. However, the network management sought to improve the show in several ways. This was done in conjunction with what is known in the industry as counterprogramming, a technique in which a successful show is moved opposite a ratings hit on another network. The show was moved from Thursdays, where it outrated CBS's The Waltons, to Sundays where it replaced the canceled sci-fi series Battlestar Galactica. The show then aired against two highly rated shows: NBC's anthology series titled The Sunday Big Event and CBS's revamped continuation of All in the Family titled Archie Bunker's Place.

Second season
The second season saw an attempt to seek younger viewers and premiered a new disco arrangement of the gentle theme tune.

The characters of Fred and Cora were dropped from the regular cast. It was explained that Fred went on tour as a conductor with an orchestra, taking Cora with him. Fred and Cora made return appearances in later episodes. Recurring characters Susan and Eugene made no further appearances after season one and were never mentioned again.

New cast members were added. Among the new supporting characters were Remo and Jeanie DaVinci (Jay Thomas and Gina Hecht), a brother and sister from New York City who owned a new neighborhood deli where Mork and Mindy now spent a lot of time. Also added as regulars were their grumpy neighbor Mr. Bickley (who was seen occasionally in the first season and ironically worked as a verse writer for a greeting-card company), portrayed by Tom Poston, and Nelson Flavor (Jim Staahl), Mindy's snooty cousin who ran for city council.

The show's main focus was no longer on Mork's slapstick attempts to adjust to the new world he was in, but on the relationship between Mork and Mindy on a romantic level. Also, some of the focus was on Mork trying to find a steady-paying job.

Because of the abrupt changes to the show and time slot, ratings slipped dramatically (dropping to 27th place). The show was quickly moved back to its previous timeslot and efforts were made to return to the core of the series; however, ratings did not recover.

Third season
For the third season, Jeanie, Remo, and Nelson were retained as regulars with Jeanie and Remo having opened a restaurant.  Nelson was no longer into politics and wore more casual clothes.

Mindy's father and grandmother returned to the series. The show acknowledged this attempt to restore its original premise, with the third season's hour-long opener titled "Putting the Ork Back in Mork".

Several supporting characters were added to the lineup. Joining were Lola and Stephanie, two children from the day-care center where Mork worked. Also added was Mindy's close friend Glenda Faye Comstock (Crissy Wilzak), a lovely young widow on whom Nelson develops a crush. Wilzak lasted one season as a regular.

When these ideas failed to improve ratings, many wilder ideas were tried, in an  attempt to capitalize on Williams' comedic talents. The season ended at number 49 in the ratings.

Fourth season
Despite the show's steady decline, ABC agreed to a fourth season of Mork & Mindy, but executives wanted changes. The show began to include special guest stars this year.

At the beginning of the fourth season, Mork and Mindy got married. Jonathan Winters, one of Williams' idols, was brought in as their child, Mearth. Because of the different Orkan physiology, Mork laid an egg, which grew and hatched into the much older Winters. Winters had previously appeared in a season 3 episode as Dave McConnell (Mindy's uncle and Fred's brother). It had been previously explained that Orkans aged "backward", thus explaining Mearth's appearance and that of his teacher, Miss Geezba (portrayed by then-11-year-old actress Louanne Sirota). After four seasons and 95 episodes, Mork & Mindy was canceled in the summer of 1982. The show ended at 60th place at season's end.

Characters
 Mork (portrayed by Robin Williams) – An alien from the planet Ork sent to observe human behavior. Mork mentions many times that Orkan scientists grew him in a test-tube.
 Mindy McConnell (portrayed by Pam Dawber) – A pretty female human who finds Mork and teaches him about human behavior. Eventually falls in love, marries Mork and raises an Orkan "child".
 Fredrick "Fred" McConnell (portrayed by Conrad Janis) – Mindy's father, a widower with conservative values. In the first season, Fred owned a music shop with Cora. In the third season, Fred became the conductor of the Boulder Symphony Orchestra.
 Grandma Cora Hudson (portrayed by Elizabeth Kerr) – Mindy's less-conservative, rock-loving grandmother and Fred's mother-in-law.
 Franklin Delano Bickley (portrayed by Tom Poston) – Mindy's downstairs neighbor. He has a job involving writing out greeting cards. At first, Franklin is a total grump and always complains about noise. In time, however, he warms up and becomes a friend to Mork and Mindy and the gang.
 Mearth (portrayed by Jonathan Winters) – The "child" of Mork and Mindy and godson of Orson. Because of Orkan physiology, Orkans age backwards starting with elderly adult bodies but with the mind of a child and regressing to feeble "old" kids.
 Remo DaVinci (portrayed by Jay Thomas) – The co-owner of The New York Delicatessen in season 2 and DaVinci's Restaurant in season 3.
 Jeanie DaVinci (portrayed by Gina Hecht) – The sister of Remo DaVinci and co-owner of The New York Delicatessen in season 2 and DaVinci's Restaurant in season 3.
 Nelson Flavor (portrayed by Jim Staahl) – The strait-laced, driven, yet aloof cousin of Mindy with dreams of political power.
 Orson (voiced by Ralph James) – Mork's mostly unseen and long-suffering superior who has sent Mork to Earth to get him off-world because humor is not permitted on Ork. Though often perplexed and exasperated with Mork's light-hearted demeanor and casual humorous views regarding his mission and life in general, Orson maintains at least a grudging respect for Mork, is patient and thoughtfully curious when receiving Mork's weekly reports, and generally allows Mork the freedom to do as he pleases while gathering information on Earth.

Recurring characters
 Susan Taylor (portrayed by Morgan Fairchild) – Mindy's snooty ex-friend from high school who was only seen in Season 1. In the episode "Mork's First Christmas", a glimpse into why Susan is such a shallow person was shown. 
 Exidor (portrayed by Robert Donner) – An odd man (with possible mental illness) who regards himself as a prophet. He often appears wearing a flowing white robe with a brown sash. He recognizes Mork as an alien, but nobody believes him. As the leader of a cult called "The Friends of Venus", of which he was the only member, Exidor regularly engaged in conversations with imaginary members of his cult (such as "Pepe" and "Rocco"), but was the only person who could see them. While his behavior is usually wild and absurdly eccentric, he is shown to have a strongly-caring and compassionate side; he frequently makes noisy and vigorous attempts to cure maladies or correct wrongdoings (which often turn out to be either imaginary or laughably minor) and he always immediately rushes to Mork's aid ("I got here just as soon as I heard, Mork!") when requested, though his well-meaning efforts to assist Mork seldom produce any actual results. Most times, Exidor is found yelling at his imaginary cult. He makes the comment "Entourages can be the pits!" Later, since the Venusians had abandoned him, Exidor began to worship O.J. Simpson when Mork encountered him at the Boulder Police Station. He also had a plan to become "Emperor of the Universe" by becoming a rock-star; his musical instrument of choice was the accordion. Exidor appears to be something of a squatter, as on at least two separate occasions he is present in homes not his own. Once Mork visited Exidor at a very nice apartment where he supposedly lived with his imaginary girlfriend and her twin sister. Another time, he is "on vacation" in Mindy's family home where he apparently believed there was a beach in the living room closet. ("Everybody out of the water! Can't you see that fin?") Exidor eventually got married, in a "forest" (Mindy's attic). Mindy thought his wife would be imaginary, but she turned out to be a real woman named Ambrosia. Exidor became highly popular with audiences and prompted wild applause from the studio audience when entering a scene.
 Mr. Miles Sternhagen (portrayed by Foster Brooks) – Mindy's boss when she gets a job at a local TV station. He is overbearing and demanding of Mindy when sober, but occasionally turns up drunk and cheerful (per Brooks' famous "drunk" act).
 Glenda Faye Comstock (portrayed by Crissy Wilzak) – Mindy's friend and recent widow who becomes the love interest of Nelson and was only seen in Season 3.
 Todd Norman "TNT" Taylor (portrayed by Bill Kirchenbauer) – An obnoxious and arrogant womanizer. He later teaches Mork to drive at the FastLane Driving School.
 Cathy McConnell (portrayed by Shelley Fabares) – Fred's new younger wife and Mindy's stepmother seen in Seasons 2–4.
 Lola and Stephanie (portrayed by Amy Tenowich and Stephanie Kayano) – Two children from the daycare center Mork works at later in the series during Season 3. Lola is a young philosopher and Stephanie is a chubby girl who loves to eat.
 Billy (portrayed by Corey Feldman) – A daycare-center child who appeared during Season 3. He wants to be like his namesake Billy the Kid. Mork introduces him to the Orkan hero Squellman the Yellow.
 Bebo (vocal effects provided by Gregg Berger) – Mork's ball-of-fur pet who spoke Orkan gibberish and was introduced and only seen in Season 3. He was occasionally seen around the house and stood by Mork during his reports to Orson. While Gregg Berger provided the vocal effects of Bebo in the first appearance, the recordings were archived for later use. 
 Eugene (portrayed by Jeffrey Jacquet) – A ten-year-old boy who takes violin lessons from Cora and befriends Mork during his appearances in Season 1. He and Mork invariably go through elaborate incantations and pantomime when greeting each other, and Mork occasionally consults Eugene regarding social matters; Eugene is always more than willing to assist, even though he often feels a bit awkward advising someone so much taller and older than himself.
 Arnold Wanker (portrayed by Logan Ramsey) – The landlord of Fred and Cora's music store during Season 1. He dies in Fred's music store, but Mork (misinterpreting the comments made to his wife) brings him back to life (a "one-in-a-billion" chance).

Connections to other shows
Actor-director Jerry Paris was inspired to create the character of Mork after directing an unusual and memorable episode of The Dick Van Dyke Show titled "It May Look Like a Walnut", in which Van Dyke's Rob Petrie has a dream wherein he believes the Earth has been surreptitiously invaded by walnut-eating aliens who steal humans' thumbs and imaginations. Series creator Carl Reiner had written the episode, which was the 20th in the show's second season and the 50th episode produced. When he moved on to direct Happy Days, Paris introduced Mork in a similarly atypical season-five episode titled My Favorite Orkan.
In it, Richie tells everyone he has seen a flying saucer, but no one else believes him. Fonzie tells him that people make up stories about UFOs because their lives are "humdrum." Then while Richie is at home, Mork walks in. He freezes everyone with his finger except Richie and says he was sent to Earth to find a "humdrum" human to take back to Ork. Richie runs to Fonzie for help. When Mork catches up to him, he freezes everyone, but finds himself unable to freeze Fonzie because of The Fonz's famous and powerful thumbs. Mork challenges Fonzie to a duel: finger vs. thumb. After their duel, The Fonz admits defeat, and Mork decides to take Fonzie back to Ork instead of Richie. Then, Richie wakes up and realizes he was dreaming. There is a knock on the door and much to Richie's dismay, it is a man who looks exactly like Mork, except in regular clothes, asking for directions.

When production on Mork & Mindy began, an extra scene was filmed and added to this episode for subsequent reruns. In the scene, Mork contacts Orson and explains that he decided to let Fonzie go, and was going to travel to the year 1978 to continue his mission. In the pilot episode of Mork & Mindy, Orson tells Mork that he is assigning him to study the planet Earth. Mork remembers that he has been to Earth before to collect a specimen (Fonzie) but he "had to throw it back, though. Too small."

Fonzie and Laverne of Laverne & Shirley appeared in the first episode of the show. In this segment, Mork relays to Mindy his trip to 1950s Milwaukee where Fonzie sets Mork up on a date with Laverne.

Mork returned to Happy Days in the episode "Mork Returns" in which Mork tells Richie that he enjoys coming to the 1950s because life is simpler and more "humdrum" than in the 1970s. Fonzie sees Mork and immediately tries to run away, but Mork freezes him and makes him stay. He eventually lets him go, but not before Fonzie asks Mork to reveal two things about the future: "cars and girls". Mork's response is, "In 1979... both are faster." The episode is mostly a retrospective in which clips are shown as Richie and Fonzie try to explain the concepts of love and friendship to Mork.

Mork also appears in the first episode of Out of the Blue, "Random's Arrival", as a crossover stunt.

Home media
Paramount Home Entertainment has released the entire series of Mork & Mindy on DVD in Region 1 in both individual season sets and a complete series configuration, while the first three seasons are available in Regions 2 and 4. The Region 1 DVD release of season 1 was from Paramount alone; subsequent releases in Region 1, as well as international season 1 releases, have been in conjunction with CBS DVD.

In Australia, only the first three seasons were released individually followed by a complete series boxset on December 17, 2014. In 2020 Via Vision Entertainment obtained the rights to the series and is releasing a Complete Series boxset on December 16, 2020.

Primetime Emmy Award nominations
For its first season, Mork & Mindy was nominated for two Primetime Emmy Awards:  Outstanding Comedy Series and Outstanding Lead Actor in a Comedy Series for Robin Williams. The program lost to Taxi and Williams lost to Carroll O'Connor for All in the Family.

Syndication
Mork & Mindy was syndicated off network by Paramount beginning in the Fall of 1982, to low ratings. By 1983, most stations that owned the show rested it much of the year running it only in the summer, when weaker programming tended to air. Few stations renewed the show a few years later.  By 1987, the show only aired in a handful of TV markets. With the expansion of cable channels available, the show began airing on cable. Nick at Nite reran the show from March 4, 1991, to November 27, 1995. The show has also aired on FOX Family Channel in the late 1990s. From 2008 to 2011, the show aired in marathons on SyFy. It has aired in subsequent years on Me-TV, the Hub Network and various other classic television stations airing on various digital subchannels. The show currently airs on Rewind TV, and streams on Pluto TV.

Filming locations

In an interview with Garry Marshall on June 30, 2006, Pat O'Brien mentioned that Mork & Mindy was filmed on Paramount stage 27, the former studio for his infotainment program The Insider.

The house from the show is located at 1619 Pine Street, just a few blocks away from the Pearl Street Mall in Boulder. This was also used in the show as Mindy's actual address in Boulder, as shown in the episode "Mork Goes Public". The same house was later used for exterior shots on the series Perfect Strangers in Episode 21 of Season 5, "This Old House", where the show's main characters, cousins Larry and Balki, remodel a home for a fix-and-flip in hopes of huge profits. Often mistaken, it was not the house the cousins moved into with their wives during the final two seasons. In addition, it was used in three episodes of Family Matters as Myra's house. , the house was valued at $1.9 million, with a last sale date of 1974 for US$80,000.

Spin-offs and adaptations
 In the United Kingdom, a long-running comic strip version was written by Angus P. Allan, illustrated by Bill Titcombe, and printed in children's television magazine, Look-In. Several British-produced annuals were also released that tied in with the series.
 A subsequent animated series titled Mork & Mindy/Laverne & Shirley/Fonz Hour ran on ABC from 1982 to 1983. The Mork & Mindy segments were a prequel with Mindy as a student in high school. The character of Eugene returned in this spin-off voiced by Shavar Ross.
 In 2005, a made-for-television movie titled Behind the Camera: The Unauthorized Story of Mork & Mindy aired on NBC. Chris Diamantopoulos portrayed Robin Williams, Erinn Hayes portrayed Pam Dawber and Daniel Roebuck portrayed producer Garry Marshall. The movie depicts Williams' instant stardom and behind the scenes turmoil that the cast and crew would have with the network.
 In 1979, a short-lived Brazilian version of the series appeared as Superbronco. It was produced by Rede Globo and starred comedian Ronald Golias and actress Liza Vieira. Superbronco had only one season and was canceled although it was among the ten highest TV audience rates in 1979.

See also

 List of Mork & Mindy episodes
 3rd Rock from the Sun
 ALF
 Marvin Marvin
 My Favorite Martian
 The Neighbors
 Out of This World
 My Hero (UK)

References

External links

 

1970s American comic science fiction television series
1970s American sitcoms
1978 American television series debuts
1980s American comic science fiction television series
1980s American sitcoms
1982 American television series endings
American television spin-offs
English-language television shows
Fictional married couples
Happy Days
Television duos
Television series about alien visitations
Television shows adapted into comics
Television shows set in Colorado